Peter Buchman (born July 13, 1967) is an American screenwriter and his writing credits include the screenplays for Jurassic Park III.

Filmography
Jurassic Park III (2001) (screenplay)
Eragon (2006) (screenplay)
Che: Part One (2008) (screenplay)
Che: Part Two (2008) (screenplay)
The Foreigner (2017) (screenplay)
The Piano Tuner (TBA) (screenplay)

External links 
 

American male screenwriters
Living people
1967 births